The Valuev Circular of 18 July 1863 was a decree  (ukaz) issued by Pyotr Valuev (Valuyev), Minister of Internal Affairs of the Russian Empire, by which many publications (religious, educational, and literature recommended for the use in primary literacy training of the commoners) in the Ukrainian language were forbidden, except for belles-lettres works. 

The circular has put the reason for the growing number of textbooks in Ukrainian and beginner-level books in Ukrainian as "the Poles' political interests" and the "separatist intentions of some of the Little Russians". The circular quoted the opinion of the Kyiv Censorship Committee that "a separate Little Russian language never existed, does not exist, and shall not exist, and the tongue used by commoners (i.e. Ukrainian) is nothing but Russian corrupted by the influence of Poland."

The circular ordered the Censorship Committees to ban the publication of religious texts, educational texts, and beginner-level books in Ukrainian; but permitted publication of belles-lettres works in the language.

Further restrictions were placed on Ukrainian by the Ems Ukaz in 1876, which completely prohibited the usage of the language in open print.

See also 
 Lithuanian press ban

Further reading 

 Alexei Miller, The Ukrainian Question. The Russian Empire and Nationalism in the Nineteenth Century, Central European University Press, Budapest - New York, 2003, 
 Magocsi, Paul Robert (1996). A History of Ukraine. Toronto: University of Toronto Press. . pp. 369-70 contain a translation.

1863 in Europe
1863 in Ukraine
1863 in the Russian Empire
Language policy in Ukraine
Politics of the Russian Empire
Ukrainian language
Anti-Ukrainian sentiment
Russification
Language policy in Russia